Marjan Mesec (born 14 August 1947) is a Slovenian ski jumper. He competed at the 1968 Winter Olympics and the 1972 Winter Olympics. He placed 38th in the 1968 Olympics in the normal hill ski jump, and then 37th for the same event in 1972. In 1972, he also placed 37th in the large hill ski jump.

References

External links
 

1947 births
Living people
Slovenian male ski jumpers
Olympic ski jumpers of Yugoslavia
Ski jumpers at the 1968 Winter Olympics
Ski jumpers at the 1972 Winter Olympics
Sportspeople from Kranj
20th-century Slovenian people